You Win Again is the twenty-eighth studio album by Northern Irish singer-songwriter Van Morrison. It is a duet album with Linda Gail Lewis that was released in 2000 (see 2000 in music) by Virgin Records.  The album was recorded at the Wool Hall, Bath, England.

Track listing
"Let's Talk About Us" (Otis Blackwell) – 2:53
"You Win Again" (Hank Williams) – 3:01
"Jambalaya (On the Bayou)" (Hank Williams) – 2:57
"Crazy Arms" (Ralph Mooney, Chuck Seals) – 3:37
"Old Black Joe" (Stephen Foster; as performed by Jerry Lee Lewis) – 3:21
"Think Twice Before You Go" (Al Smith) – 2:38
"No Way Pedro" (Van Morrison) – 3:44
"Shot of Rhythm and Blues" (Terry Thompson) – 3:59
"Real Gone Lover" (Dave Bartholomew, Ruth Durand, Joseph Robichaux) – 3:09
"Why Don't You Love Me (Like You Used to Do)?" (Hank Williams) – 2:23
"Cadillac" (Ellas McDaniel) – 2:33
"Baby (You've Got What It Takes)" (Clyde Otis, Murray Stein, Brook Benton) – 3:45
"Boogie Chillen" (John Lee Hooker) – 4:00

Personnel
Van Morrison – vocals, acoustic and electric guitars, harmonica
Linda Gail Lewis – vocal, piano
Ned Edwards – electric guitar, mandolin, background vocals
Paul Godden – steel guitar
Lee Goodall – saxophone
Pete Hurley – bass
Colin Griffin – drums

Charts
Album – UK Album Chart (United Kingdom)

Album – Billboard (North America)

References

Van Morrison albums
2000 albums
Virgin Records albums
Albums produced by Van Morrison